The Economic History Society of Australia and New Zealand is a learned society. Since its foundation in 1974, it has published the Australian Economic History Review. It also holds annual conferences and awards prizes for contributions to the field.  An annual lecture in honour of Noel Butlin has been held since 2004, replacing the biennial lecture in honour of Alfred Charles Davidson that ended in the 1990s.

References

Australia and New Zealand
Economic history of Australia
Economic history of New Zealand